Zanaglina  is a village in the municipality of Kupres, Bosnia and Herzegovina.

Demographics 
According to the 2013 census, its population was nil, down from 66 in 1991.

References

Populated places in Kupres